Michael Mel is a Papua New Guinean academic in visual arts at the University of Goroka, curator, philosopher, musician and playwright. Mel was born in 1959 in Wila near Vulcano Hagan in the Western Highlands.

Early life
Michael Mel born in 1959,was from wila village,Mount Hagen. His father had great memory remembering family history up to 5 generations.His parents never tasted rice and bread, and Michael revealed he grew up on kaukau(sweet potatoes).He went to school with Sisters of Mercy.

Career
As an artist Mel principally specialized in performance and installation art and body painting. Furthermore, he is known for his Chanted Tales, traditional historic stories of local people that serve for passing social responsibility and morality. Mel exerted himself to it that people obtained access to them again, since they had fallen into oblivion since English language had become the principal language in the country.

Awards
In 2006 Mel was honored with a Prince Claus Award for his key role in the cultural development of the communities of the highlands of Papua New Guinea.

References 

Papua New Guinean musicians
21st-century dramatists and playwrights
20th-century dramatists and playwrights
21st-century philosophers
20th-century philosophers
Papua New Guinean curators
Living people
1959 births
People from the Western Highlands Province
Papua New Guinean philosophers
University of Goroka